Zaine Cordy (born 27 October 1996) is a professional Australian rules footballer who plays  for the St Kilda Football Club in the Australian Football League (AFL), having initially been recruited as a father–son pick by the Western Bulldogs with the 62nd draft pick in the 2014 AFL draft. He is the son of former Bulldogs player Brian Cordy, the brother of former Bulldogs player Ayce Cordy, and the nephew of sports reporter and former Sydney Swans and Western Bulldogs player Neil Cordy.

Early football
Cordy played junior football for the Ocean Grove Cobras. He also played for the Geelong Falcons in the TAC Cup.

AFL career
Cordy debuted in the Bulldogs' 23-point victory over the North Melbourne Football Club in the 22nd round of the 2015 AFL season. On debut, he picked up just one disposal but also collected two tackles. At the beginning of the 2016 season, Cordy signed on until 2018.

In 2016, Cordy moved positions, from key defender to centre half-forward and played nine games and kicked eight goals. After playing in every game since Round 19, he became part of the Bulldogs' 2016 premiership team. In the grand final, he kicked the opening goal and had 11 disposals. After 2016, he switched back to playing as a key defender.

In May 2018, Cordy signed a contract extension, keeping him at the Bulldogs until 2021.

Statistics

 Statistics are correct to the end of the 2021 season

|- style="background-color: #EAEAEA"
! scope="row" style="text-align:center" | 2015
|
| 12 || 2 || 0 || 0 || 2 || 6 || 8 || 2 || 4 || 0.0 || 0.0 || 1.0 || 3.0 || 4.0 || 1.0 || 2.0
|-
| scope=row bgcolor=F0E68C style="text-align:center" | 2016#
|
| 12 || 9 || 8 || 1 || 51 || 32 || 83 || 25 || 22 || 0.9 || 0.1 || 5.7 || 3.6 || 9.2 || 2.8 || 2.4
|- style=background:#EAEAEA
| scope="row" style="text-align:center" | 2017
|
| 12 || 19 || 0 || 0 || 149 || 92 || 241 || 82 || 49 || 0 || 0 || 7.8 || 4.8 || 12.7 || 4.3 || 2.6
|-
| scope="row" style="text-align:center" | 2018
|
| 12 || 18 || 2 || 1 || 142 || 72 || 214 || 73 || 35 || 0.1 || 0.06 || 7.9 || 4 || 11.9 || 4.0 || 1.9
|- style=background:#EAEAEA
| scope="row" style="text-align:center" | 2019
|
| 12 || 23 || 0 || 1 || 129 || 95 || 224 || 72 || 40 || 0.0 || 0.04 || 5.6 || 4.1 || 9.7 || 3.1 || 1.7
|-
| scope="row" style="text-align:center" | 2020
|
| 12 || 14 || 0 || 0 || 86 || 32 || 118 || 40 || 20 || 0.0 || 0.0 || 6.1 || 2.3 || 8.4 || 2.9 || 1.4
|-
| scope="row" style="text-align:center" | 2021
|
| 12 || 19 || 0 || 0 || 126 || 57 || 183 || 67 || 38 || 0.0 || 0.0 || 6.6 || 3.0 || 9.6 || 3.5 || 2.0
|-
|- class="sortbottom"
! colspan=3| Career
! 104
! 10
! 3
! 685
! 384
! 1071
! 361
! 208
! 0.1
! 0.02
! 6.6
! 3.7
! 10.3
! 3.5
! 2.0
|}

Honours and achievementsTeamAFL premiership''': 2016

References

External links

1996 births
Living people
Western Bulldogs players
Western Bulldogs Premiership players
Geelong Falcons players
Australian rules footballers from Victoria (Australia)
People educated at Geelong College
One-time VFL/AFL Premiership players